"Congratulations" is a song by Swedish YouTuber PewDiePie (Felix Kjellberg), Swedish singer, YouTuber, and musician Roomie (Joel Berghult), and English musician and YouTuber Boyinaband (David Brown). The single was self-released on 31 March 2019 with an accompanying music video on YouTube as a response to T-Series surpassing PewDiePie as the most-subscribed YouTube channel. The music video is banned on YouTube in India. , the video has over 226 million views, making it PewDiePie's second most-viewed video, his most viewed being his previous T-Series diss track, Bitch Lasagna.

Background

In mid-2018, the subscriber count of the Indian music video channel T-Series rapidly approached that of Swedish web comedian and Let's Player PewDiePie, who at the time was the most-subscribed YouTuber. As a response, PewDiePie fans and other YouTubers had shown their support for PewDiePie, while T-Series fans and other YouTubers had shown support for T-Series, in the PewDiePie vs T-Series competition. During the competition, both channels had been gaining a large number of subscribers at a rapid rate. The two channels had surpassed each other in subscriber count on a number of occasions in February, March, and April 2019.

Composition and lyrics
"Congratulations" is an upbeat-sounding synth-pop/hip-hop diss track whose instrumentals are based on "Buckwild" by 2Virgins. In the music video, PewDiePie criticizes T-Series for achieving their early success by selling pirated songs and chairman Bhushan Kumar for alleged tax evasion (in reference to a Times of India article). He also mocks T-Series for sending him a cease and desist letter alleging that his actions and lyrics of "Bitch Lasagna" were defamatory. He also mentioned the CEO of T-Series' tax evasion scandal, collusions with the Mumbai mafia, and #MeToo allegations.

The video also thanks to his fans for sticking with him through his YouTube career, referencing past videos.

Reception
Eight days after it was released, "Congratulations" was banned in India, alongside PewDiePie's earlier diss track, "Bitch Lasagna". The Delhi High Court granted an injunction against the two songs at the request of T-Series, who asserted the tracks were "defamatory, disparaging, insulting, and offensive" and that the songs contained "repeated comments ... abusive, vulgar, and also racist in nature." In their decision, the court noted that PewDiePie, in communication with T-Series after the release of "Bitch Lasagna", had apologized after posting the first video and had "assured that he [was] not planning any more video[s] on the same line."

In August 2019, it was reported that T-Series and PewDiePie had settled their legal disputes outside of court.

Music video
A music video for the song was released the same day. The video was previously recorded in November 2018 in anticipation of T-Series surpassing his subscriber count. It shows PewDiePie, Roomie, and Boyinaband throwing a party inside a room adorned with party decorations, balloons, champagne, and a cake that imitates the T-Series logo. They sing and dance congratulating T-Series in a tongue-in-cheek manner. At the bridge of the song after the second verse, PewDiePie gives a "Thank You" to all his fans and subscribers for supporting his career and gives a "Brofist" to the camera, before the video cuts to the final chorus of the song with a scene showing PewDiePie, Roomie, and Boyinaband launching fireworks outside in the night. The video ends with MrBeast giving a slow clap to the song. , the music video has received over 226 million views.

Charts

See also 
 
 PewDiePie videography

References

2019 YouTube videos
2019 songs
2019 singles
Anti-Indian sentiment
Diss tracks
English-language Swedish songs
Obscenity controversies in music
Online obscenity controversies
PewDiePie songs
Race-related controversies in music
T-Series (company)
Synth-pop songs
Comedy rap songs
Satirical songs